The 2006 United States House of Representatives elections in Nebraska were held on November 4, 2006 to determine who will represent the state of Nebraska in the United States House of Representatives. Nebraska has three seats in the House, apportioned according to the 2000 United States Census. Representatives are elected for two-year terms.

Overview

District 1 

 

Incumbent Republican Jeff Fortenberry defeated Democrat Maxine Moul, a former Lieutenant Governor. This district covers the eastern part of the state.

Results

District 2 

 

Incumbent Republican Lee Terry defeated Democrat Jim Esch, an attorney. This district covers the metro Omaha area.

Results

District 3 

 

Republican Adrian Smith, a state Legislator, defeated Democrat Scott Kleeb, a history professor.  District 3 covers most of western Nebraska, comprises 69 counties and is considered to be a traditional Republican stronghold. In the 2006 midterm elections, Republican incumbent Tom Osborne did not seek re-election, instead making a failed bid for the Nebraska gubernatorial nomination. In his stead, Republican Adrian Smith, who won the Republican primary with 39% of the vote in a field of five candidates, defeated Democratic nominee Scott Kleeb, 55% to 45%.  This ten-point margin was the closest election in the 3rd District since 1990, and the closest a Democrat had come to winning the district in 18 years.  In a very strong year for Democrats, the 2006 3rd District congressional race drew last-minute attention from the national House campaign committees  as well as a campaign visit from President George W. Bush on Smith's behalf two days before the election.

Toward the end of the campaign, controversy surrounded a series of automated telephone calls to voters. These calls used an unauthorized recording of Kleeb's voice which allegedly distorted his views, and were often made in the middle of the night.  After thorough investigation by the Nebraska Public Service Commission, the complaint file was closed with no wrongdoing found by the Kleeb vendor of robocalls, political candidates, or their committees.

Since the 2006 election, Adrian Smith has won re-election in the 3rd District with at least 70% of the vote each time.  He was elected with 77% of the vote in 2008, 70% in 2010, and 74% in 2012.

Results

References 

2006 Nebraska elections
Neb

2006